William Christopher “Chris” Gorog is an entertainment and technology executive that has served in senior leadership positions in Hollywood and Silicon Valley, including as chairman and chief executive officer of Napster, a top digital music brand, and Roxio.

Gorog played a central role in efforts to monetize digital music downloads and streams. He oversaw Roxio's conversion to a digital music subscription and download service through the acquisitions of Pressplay and Napster. Gorog was a key ally of the record labels in the digital music market but was also a vocal critic of the licensing terms and DRM restrictions that labels imposed on digital music services.

Gorog began his entertainment career as a business affairs executive at The Walt Disney Company, continued his work in film and television as CEO of ITC Entertainment, moved to Universal Studios as executive vice president of group operations for the Recreation Group, and then on to CEO positions with Roxio and Napster as the entertainment business converged with new technologies.

Gorog was born in Fontainebleau France, raised in Dayton, Ohio, and graduated from San Diego State University with a B.A.S. in telecommunications and film. Gorog comes from an entrepreneurial family. His father, William F. Gorog, was co-founder and chief executive of Data Corp, which created LexisNexis.

After ten years of developing Napster, Chris Gorog stepped down in January 2010 and started gorog.net to serve as a foundation to explore new opportunities in entertainment, media and technology.

Napster

Gorog led the acquisition of Napster, the peer-to-peer network that made music downloading a phenomenon, in 2002.  He re-launched the pioneer digital music brand as a legal music provider in 2003, which became a public company in 2004. Under Gorog’s leadership as chairman and CEO of Napster, the company assembled one of the largest digital music catalogs in the world and expanded its global presence by offering its service in the U.K, Germany and Japan. Napster created a number of digital music product innovations under Gorog’s management, including the introduction of portable subscriptions, a free advertising supported version of Napster, as well as a variety of mobile music offerings.

Gorog also oversaw the development of a number of advertising campaigns for the company, including “Its Coming Back,” Napster’s re-launch campaign featuring a series of original animations that received both the Cannes Lion Award
and the Silver Effie. Napster was also awarded Billboard magazine’s “Best Digital Music Community” award for its U.S. music service.

Best Buy acquired Napster in 2008, and Gorog served as Napster’s chief executive officer until January 6, 2010.

Roxio

As chairman and chief executive officer of Roxio, Gorog led the company’s successful spin-off from Adaptec, took the company public in May 2001 and drove the creation of the Roxio consumer brand. Roxio became the leader in CD burning software, with 70% market share led by its brands Easy CD Creator and Toast. In January 2002, Gorog led Roxio’s acquisition of MGI Software that expanded the company’s portfolio to include photo and video editing software, as well as the top-selling system-recovery software for crash and virus recovery.

In December 2002, Gorog led Roxio’s acquisition of Napster – and followed with an acquisition of Universal Music’s and Sony’s Pressplay in May 2003, which served as the new technology platform for the company’s release of Napster 2.0, the revitalized legal version of the original Napster.  In August 2004, Roxio sold the software business in order to focus entirely on developing the Napster digital music business.  The company officially changed its corporate name from Roxio (NASDAQ: ROXI) to Napster (NASDAQ: NAPS) in January 2005.

Entertainment

Prior to Gorog’s technology positions, he served in a variety of senior capacities in the entertainment business, including executive vice president of Universal Studios Recreation Group, where he helped manage Universal Studios Hollywood, Universal Studios Florida and Universal’s multibillion-dollar theme park expansion in Florida and Japan. Gorog later served as president of new business development for Universal Studios Recreation Group. Prior to Universal, Gorog served as president and CEO of ITC Entertainment and as vice president business affairs motion pictures and television for The Walt Disney Company.

Board positions

Gorog has served as a director on a variety of entertainment and technology boards, including House of Blues, Guitar Center and Critical Path, in addition to serving on the boards of Roxio and Napster as its chairman. He also has served on the board of directors of NARM, the National Association of Recording Merchandisers.

Affiliations
Gorog is a member of the Young Presidents' Organization and the Academy of Motion Picture Arts and Sciences.

Keynotes

 May 1, 2007 – Digital NARM – Chicago, IL: “Bridging the Gap between Physical and Digital”
 May 1, 2006 – MuseExpo – Hollywood, CA: “Unlimited access – Anytime, Anywhere”
 April 5, 2005 – Leadership Music Digital Summit – Nashville, TN: “Digital Subscriptions: The Future of The Music Industry”
 July 26, 2004 – Jupiter Plug-In – New York, NY: “The State of the Digital Music Industry”
 May 3, 2004 – Financial Times – London, England: “The Best Defense if a Good Offense, The Rise of Legitimate On-Line Music Services”
 April 20, 2004 – Music Board of Ireland and the European Union – Dublin, Ireland: “The Internet & the Democratization of Music”
 December 8, 2003 – iHollywood Forum – Universal City, CA: "Music 2.0"
 July 28, 2003 – Jupiter Plug-In – New York, NY: "The Return of Napster"
 March 3, 2003 – Digital Music Forum – New York, NY: "The Impact of Technology on Music Business Today"
 January 24, 2003 – MidemNet – Cannes, France: "Music and Technology Back on Track"

References

External links
 Chris Gorog's official site
 Napster Rolls Out MP3 Store in Challenge to iTunes
 BusinessWeek Q&A with Napster CEO Chris Gorog
 FTSE Global Markets Cover Story
 The Engadget Interview: Chris Gorog, CEO of Napster
 Q&A: Napster ex-CEO Chris Gorog 

American technology chief executives
Living people
San Diego State University alumni
Year of birth missing (living people)